New Jeans is the debut extended play (EP) by South Korean girl group NewJeans. It was released digitally on August 1, 2022 and physically on August 8, 2022 by ADOR, a subsidiary of Hybe Corporation. The EP contains four tracks, including the three singles "Attention", "Hype Boy" and "Cookie". Musically, the album spans a variety of music genres, including R&B, moombahton, electropop and hip hop.

Background and release 
In early 2019, Big Hit Entertainment (now called Hybe Corporation) announced preparations to debut a new girl group in collaboration with Source Music under the tutelage of then-CBO Min Hee-jin, who is widely recognized for her work as a former visual director at SM Entertainment. The project transferred to Hybe's recently established record label ADOR (All Doors One Room), of which Min was appointed CEO following the COVID-19 pandemic. Media reports revealed that the lineup was finalized in March 2022, and official social media accounts for ADOR were opened.

Following media reports, three animated clips of numbers, "22", "7", and "22" were posted on ADOR's social media accounts, hinting that their new girl group's first content would be released on July 22. On July 22, the group released the music video for their debut single "Attention" as a surprise release, with no preceding promotion or details on the members' identities. The video which was shot in Spain received more than 1.3 million views in less than 24 hours and was swiftly followed by the announcement of their debut self-titled extended play (EP), where it was revealed to be having four tracks, with two of them to be released as additional singles. Pre-orders for the EP opened on July 25. On July 23, NewJeans released their second single, "Hype Boy", where a 50-second clip revealing the members, as well as four additional music videos specific to each member were released on the same day. After two days, a music video for their B-side "Hurt" was released. On August 1, the group released the final music video the third lead single, "Cookie" following the digital release of the album on the same day and physical release on August 8.

Composition 
The EP has been described as a pop record that incorporates genres such as moombahton, electropop and hip hop, which, according to ADOR, is easy to listen to "anywhere, anytime" and was "produced in a way that focuses on the members' voices without over-engineering sound". Critics noted that the EP was able to "give a dreamy and a kitsch mood and flesh out the group's Y2K vision".

Songs 
"Attention" has been described as a song with "a groovy je ne sais quoi highlighted by a bustling beat" and "key changes that jump between major and minor which keeps its early 2000s R&B-influenced instrumentation minimal". NewJeans member Danielle participated in writing lyrics for the track. "Hype Boy" is a moombahton and electropop mash-up that emphasizes the members' "distinct vocals". Member Hanni contributed to the song's lyrics. "Cookie" features a minimal hip hop beat and "dance-pop with fat synths and a twist on the Jersey club sound" over lyrics of "self-assurance—with a hint of tension". The closing song, "Hurt", is a "sad" R&B track backed by "groovy drums and smooth, bittersweet vocals that give the impression that the members are performing a cappella".

Critical reception 

Carmen Chin of NME gave three out of five stars, stating that "with their musical ability and the label's bold artistic vision, NewJeans have managed to lay some solid groundwork for a bright future as trailblazers". Joshua Minsoo Kim of Pitchfork wrote, "NewJeans' launch has been the most elaborate campaign in K-pop this year", stating that the EP is "a plush and stylish collection of '90s and '00s-indebted R&B production". In December 2022, Rolling Stone ranked it as number 46 in their list of best 100 albums of 2022, describing the EP as "a unique sound and fresh visual component, leaning heavily into a Nineties pop aesthetic that suits this band well and guarantees replays".

Commercial performance 
On July 28, it was announced that pre-orders of New Jeans exceeded 444,000 copies, breaking the record for the highest number of stock pre-orders for any Korean girl group debut album in history. After the release of New Jeans, all tracks immediately ranked high on major South Korean domestic music charts such as Melon, Genie, Bugs!, and Vibe. On the first day of its release, the EP achieved 2.06 million streams on Spotify Korea, the most for any K-pop girl group that debuted in 2022. Singles "Attention" and "Hype Boy" placed in the top two of Korean Spotify's Daily Top Songs chart for two consecutive days, while "Cookie" ranked third on the second day of release. Overseas, the three singles managed to enter the real-time charts of Line Music, Japan's largest music site. On the first day of release alone, New Jeans sold over 262,800 combined copies, breaking the record set by labelmate Le Sserafim's Fearless, which recorded 175,000 first-day album sales in May earlier same year.

Promotion 
Following the release of New Jeans, NewJeans held a live countdown on YouTube on the same day to introduce the extended play and communicate with their fans. On August 4, they held their debut stage on Mnet's M Countdown, where they performed all three lead singles. The promotions continued through Music Bank on August 5, where they performed "Attention", and Inkigayo on August 7, where the quintet performed "Attention" and "Cookie". A pop-up store on The Hyundai, Seoul to commemorate the release of New Jeans is scheduled to open from August 11 to 31 and sell official merchandise of New Jeans and ADOR.

Track listing

Charts

Weekly charts

Monthly charts

Year-end charts

Certifications

Release history

References 

NewJeans EPs
2022 debut EPs
Korean-language EPs
Hybe Corporation EPs